The Montenegrin Party (CP) is a political party in Serbia, representing the Montenegrin minority. It is based in the city of Novi Sad. The party was founded by Nenad Stevović, who was its leader from 2008 to 2014, when he resigned.

History 
The Montenegrin Party was founded on 18 February 2008 and was registered as a political party in the Serbian Ministry of Justice on 22 February 2008, becoming the first political party that represents the Montenegrin minority in Serbia. Montenegrin Party ran as a minority list in the 2008 parliamentary election. However, the party won only 0.07% of votes, failing to obtain a seat in the National Assembly. The party also ran independently in the 2012 and 2014, winning 0.1% and 0.18% votes respectively. In the 2014 election the Montenegrin Party electoral list was headed by Joška Broz, president of the Communist Party and grandson of former Yugoslav leader Josip Broz Tito. The party did not run in the 2016 parliamentary election, and supported the candidacy of Saša Janković in the 2017 presidential election.

Elections

Parliamentary elections

References

2008 establishments in Serbia
Montenegrin nationalism
Nationalist parties in Serbia
Political parties established in 2008
Political parties of minorities in Serbia
Pro-European political parties in Serbia
Serbian people of Montenegrin descent